The 27th International 500-Mile Sweepstakes Race was held at the Indianapolis Motor Speedway on May 30, 1939. The race was won by the number two car of Wilbur Shaw, who started in the third position, driving a Maserati 8CTF. The race was notable for a three car accident on lap 109, when Floyd Roberts, the reigning champion, was killed when his car went through the wooden outer wall at over  an hour at the backstretch. In Louis Meyer's final Indy 500, he too would crash at the backstretch at over  an hour, but he walked away unharmed.

Time trials
Ten-lap qualifying runs were eliminated for 1939, and the distance reverted to four-lap (10 mile) runs. This change was made permanent, and four-lap runs have been used ever since.

Floyd Roberts crash
With Roberts on lap 109, the car driven by Bob Swanson lost control and went sideways. Roberts' car contacted Swanson's, causing Swanson's car to eject Swanson, flip over, and catch fire, while Roberts' car went through the outer wall. Attempting to avoid the accident, Chet Miller swerved into the debris field. His car flipped, and went into the inner wall. Two spectators were also injured by flying debris. The three drivers were taken to hospitals, while it took over 30 minutes to clear the burning wreck of Swanson's car from the track. Roberts death due to brain injuries was announced before the race was completed.

First rear-engined car
George Bailey became the first driver to compete with a rear-engined car in the Indianapolis 500 when he contested the 1939 race in a Gulf-Miller.

Results

Alternates
First alternate: George Robson

Failed to Qualify
Henry Banks (#39)
Sam Hanks  (#42)
Tommy Hinnershitz  (#33)
Ronney Householder (#26)
Frank McGurk (#41)
Zeke Meyer (#27)
Duke Nalon (#7)
Johnny Seymour (#61)
Lou Webb  (#59)
Doc Williams (#36)

See also
 1939 AAA Championship Car season

References

Indianapolis 500 races
Indianapolis 500
Indianapolis 500
1939 in American motorsport
May 1939 sports events